Captain America: Super Soldier is a 2011 third-person single-player video game published by Sega for Nintendo DS, PlayStation 3, Wii, Xbox 360, and Nintendo 3DS. It is based on the film Captain America: The First Avenger. The story of the game takes place during the events of the film, telling Captain America's adventures against the Red Skull and HYDRA.

HYDRA's castle appears in the game as Captain America has to fight many henchmen such as the infamous Iron Cross, the forces of HYDRA, and Red Skull. Arnim Zola also appears in the game as players will have to stop his evil experiments.

Chris Evans, Neal McDonough, Hayley Atwell, Sebastian Stan, Kenneth Choi and JJ Feild reprise their roles from the film. The version for iOS is titled Captain America: Sentinel of Liberty.

Gameplay
Captain America: Super Soldier combines a combat system inspired by the Batman: Arkham series with platforming elements. The character can use a variety of shield attacks that can be used to defeat enemies, solving puzzles, and climbing up walls. Captain America can also deploy a Tactical Vision that reveal the position of interactable surfaces.

The controllable character can be upgraded through Intel points. Intel points can be collected by beating soldiers or retrieving items on the battlefield.

Stereoscopic 3D
The Xbox 360 and PlayStation 3 versions of Captain America: Super Soldier include a stereoscopic 3D mode for 3D HDTVs and for 2D HDTVs via Inficolor 3D glasses. It uses TriOviz for Game Technology for stereoscopic 3D support. All Captain America: Super Soldier gameplay and cinematics have S3D support.

Plot
In France 1944, two U.S. soldiers are attacked by HYDRA, but Captain America arrives to save them and fends off the Hydra forces before contacting Howard Stark with regards to the enemy weapons.

While in communication with Peggy Carter, Captain America learns that the munitions recovered from the battle came from the Bavarian mountains based on the rare metal used and is briefed on HYDRA scientist Dr. Arnim Zola's Project: Master Man, which involves unlocking the human genome's secrets and achieving immortality. Captain America drops down in a village near a Bavarian castle and disables the anti-air cannons so the Invaders can enter the village before proceeding to destroy a nearby armory to prevent the Nazis from receiving more weapons.

Making his way through Hydra forces, Captain America fights Baron Wolfgang Von Strucker, who manages to knock him unconscious. The former awakens in Zola's lab, with Iron Cross and Madame Hydra restraining him as Zola explains how he drew samples of the Captain's blood to recreate Dr. Abraham Erskine's Super-Soldier Serum and captured some of the Invaders before imprisoning Captain America. After escaping his cell and while making his way through the complex, Captain America rescues Bucky Barnes, who informs him that Dum Dum Dugan and James Falsworth, among other POW's, are being held captive nearby.

While Bucky rescues the POW's, Captain America rescues Dugan before pursuing Madame Hydra, who has taken Falsworth. He eventually reaches and fights her, though she escapes. Learning that Hydra's leader, the Red Skull, is arriving to see Zola's work and bringing the Cosmic Cube with him, Captain America decides to pursue him instead. He soon arrives in Zola's special lab, where he prevents Zola from giving the Red Skull a perfected Super-Soldier Serum and defeats Iron Cross. However, the Red Skull awakens the Sleeper, which destroys the lab and covers the Red Skull's escape while Zola activates a robot body for himself in another room. Surviving the destruction, Captain America pinpoints Falsworth's location in a nearby village.

Just as he finds him, Captain America battles Zola's robot before freeing Falsworth. Reuniting with Barnes and Dugan, Captain America rallies the Invaders before they fight and destroy the Sleeper together and leave with the rescued POW's.

Reception

The game received mixed reviews upon release, with review aggregation site Metacritic giving the Xbox 360 version an average score of 60/100, the PlayStation 3 a 61/100, and the Wii a 57/100.

IGN gave the game a 5/10, praising the "solid and varied combat", but criticizing the lack of cinematic experience. GameSpot gave 6.5/10, stating "Captain America bashes enemies with style, but a dull story and bland visuals keep Super Soldier from being a star-spangled success". Some reviews were generally positive with G4 giving the game a 4/5, offering praise for rising above then-recent comic book adaptations Thor: God of Thunder and Iron Man 2, and the UK's PlayStation Official Magazine giving the game 7 out of 10, praising the combat and general tone of the game but criticizing elements of the presentation and reliance on 'Quick Time Events'.

References

External links
 
 

2011 video games
Action video games
Cancelled PlayStation Portable games
Cancelled Windows games
Griptonite Games
Marvel Cinematic Universe video games
Nintendo 3DS games
Nintendo DS games
PlayStation 3 games
Sega video games
Superhero video games
Video games based on Captain America
Video games based on films
Video games based on adaptations
Video games developed in Canada
Video games developed in the United States
Video games scored by Bill Brown
Video games with stereoscopic 3D graphics
Video games set in castles
Video games set in France
Video games set in Germany
Wii games
Xbox 360 games
Captain America (film series)
Video games set in the 1940s
High Voltage Software games
Single-player video games
Next Level Games games
Video games about World War II alternate histories